The 2017 Scottish Women's Premier League season was the 16th season of the Scottish Women's Premier League, the highest division of women's football in Scotland since its inception in 2002.

The Premier League is split into two divisions of eight teams each.  The divisions are named SWPL 1 and SWPL 2.

Glasgow City won the SWPL 1 title unbeaten. It was their eleventh consecutive title.

Teams

SWPL 1

SWPL 2

SWPL 1

Format
Teams played each other three times, with the bottom placed team being relegated after the season. The SWPL2 plays the same format with the winning team being promoted.

Standings
Teams played 21 matches each.

Results

Matches 1 to 14

Matches 15 to 21

SWPL 2

Standings
Teams played 21 matches each.

Results

Matches 1 to 14

Matches 15 to 21

Awards

Monthly awards 
The "Player of the Month" award was first awarded in September 2017.

Annual awards

References

External links
Season at soccerway.com

1
Scot
Scot
Scottish Women's Premier League seasons